Rivière-du-Loup Town Hall is the seat of local government in Rivière-du-Loup, Quebec, Canada. It is located at 189 Lafontaine Street.

It was designed by architect Georges Ouimet in incorporating references to the Arts and Crafts Movement and the Second Empire style. It was built by contractors Lachance et Fils and was completed in 1916. It was enlarged from 1972 to 1973.

It was designated as a National Historic Site of Canada on November 23, 1984.

References

External links
City of Rivière-du-Loup - Official website

Rivière-du-Loup
Buildings and structures in Bas-Saint-Laurent
Government buildings completed in 1916
City and town halls in Quebec
Arts and Crafts architecture
Buildings and structures on the National Historic Sites of Canada register